The Spanish Synagogue is one of the two functioning synagogues in the Venetian Ghetto of Venice, northern Italy. It is open for services from Passover until the end of the High Holiday season.

The Spanish Synagogue was founded by Jews expelled from the Iberian peninsula in the 1490s who reached Venice, usually via Amsterdam, Livorno or Ferrara, in the 1550s. The four-story yellow stone building was constructed in 1580 and was restored in 1635. It is a clandestine synagogue, which was tolerated on the condition that it be concealed within a building that gives no appearance being a house of worship form the exterior, although the interior is elaborately decorated.

The synagogue's ornate interior contains three large chandeliers and a dozen smaller ones, as well as a huge sculpted wooden ceiling.

References

External links

The Spanish Synagogue

Dutch-Jewish diaspora
Orthodox synagogues in Italy
Synagogues in Venice
Sephardi synagogues
Jews and Judaism in Venice
Sephardi Jewish culture in Italy
16th-century synagogues
Religious buildings and structures completed in 1580
1580s establishments in the Republic of Venice
Baldassare Longhena buildings
Portuguese-Jewish diaspora in Europe
Spanish-Jewish diaspora in Europe